The swamp barb or chola barb (Puntius chola) is a tropical freshwater fish belonging to the subfamily Cyprininae of the family Cyprinidae.  It originates in inland waters in Asia, and is found in Pakistan, India, Nepal, Bangladesh, Sri Lanka, Bhutan, and Myanmar. Puntius brevis is also sometimes known as swamp barb.

Common name 
The common name is swamp barb.
It is also known as Puthi in Assamese and Bengali.

Description
The fish will grow in length up to 6 inches (15 centimeters) and weigh up to 60 grams (2.1 ounces).

Habitat
It natively inhabits streams, rivers, canals, mangroves, marshes, swamps, ponds, and inundated fields, mainly in shallow water. It feeds on worms, benthic crustaceans, insects, and plant matter.

Importance to humans
The swamp barb is of commercial importance in the aquarium trade the fisheries industry and very good live feed for Arowana and for live Predator aquarium fishes.

Breeding
The swamp barb is an open water, substrate egg-scatterer, and adults do not guard the eggs.

During breeding time, the males display very prominent red bands, which lasts for around two days (rivaling Rosy Barbs - P conchonius), while females display red stripes which last around 5 hours.

See:  http://www.ias.ac.in/currsci/apr102008/922.pdf for colour photos of P chola in courtship.

Name origins
The swamp barb was originally named Cyprinus chola by Dr. Francis Buchanan-Hamilton in 1822, and has also been referred to in scientific literature as Puntius titius, Barbus chola, Capoeta chola, or Barbus titius. In Bengali:পুঁটি

See also
 List of freshwater aquarium fish species

References 

 

Puntius
Fish described in 1822
Taxa named by Francis Buchanan-Hamilton
Barbs (fish)